Amorbia eccopta is a species of moth of the family Tortricidae. It is found in Costa Rica, Guatemala and Mexico at altitudes between sea level and 1,600 meters.

The length of the forewings is 8.4–9 mm for males and 10-11.5 mm for females. The ground colour of the forewings is straw yellow and the hindwings are also straw yellow. There are multiple generations per year.

The larvae feed on Persea americana, Ocotea species, Rosa species, Conostegia xalapensis, Hampea appendiculata, Inga longispica and Inga vera. Full-grown larvae reach a length of about 25 mm.

References

Moths described in 1913
Sparganothini
Moths of Central America